

The Victa Aircruiser was a 1960s Australian four-seat touring monoplane designed by Henry Millicer and built by Victa.

Development
Following the success of the earlier Airtourer, Millicer designed a four-seat version which he called the Aircruiser. The prototype registered VH-MVR first flew on 18 July 1966. Like the Airtourer it was a low-wing monoplane with a fixed nosewheel landing gear and powered by a  Continental IO-360-H piston engine. Rather than the sliding clear Perspex canopy of the Airtourer, the four-seat Aircruiser had a fixed cabin roof with a single "car type" door on the left hand side.

Although Victa completed certification testing, no production of the Aircruiser followed, as Victa closed down its Aviation Division after failing to get financial assistance from the Australian government. (Both Victa and Transavia Corporation requested subsidies for Australian designed and built light aircraft, with Victa seeking a subsidy of up to 60% of the factory cost.) Following the sale of the design rights of the Airtourer to Aero Engine Services Limited (AESL) of New Zealand the rights to the Aircruiser were also sold to AESL in 1969. AESL's Chief Designer Pat Monk re-designed the aircraft as the AESL CT/4 Airtrainer, a fully aerobatic (+6G, -3G) military trainer.

In 2013 Brumby Aircraft Australia announced the company had purchased the type certificate for the Victa Aircruiser to be developed into the Brumby Aircruiser.

Specifications (Aircruiser 210) (performance estimated)

See also

References

Notes

Bibliography

 
 

1960s Australian civil utility aircraft